The Infatuation (formerly known as Immaculate Infatuation) is an American New York-based restaurant recommendation website and messaging service, created by former music industry executives Chris Stang and Andrew Steinthal in 2009. They are most known for publishing restaurant reviews and guides, and as creators of the hashtag #EEEEEATS.

They have developed an Android and iPhone app, and operate an SMS-based restaurant recommendation service called Text Rex.  In 2017 they launched their food and music festival brand EEEEEATSCON.

On March 6, 2018, the company acquired the Zagat rating company from Google for an undisclosed amount.

On September 9, 2021, the company was acquired by JPMorgan Chase & Co.

History 
Immaculate Infatuation was established in 2009 by Stang and Steinthal with the aim of providing honest restaurant reviews without accepting invitations from restaurants or announcing their presence to a wait staff. They later shortened the company name to The Infatuation.

Funding 
On September 27, 2018 The Infatuation raised $30 million from a third round of venture funding from WndrCo, the media holding company co-founded by the Hollywood mogul Jeffrey Katzenberg.

Zagat acquisition 
On March 5, 2018, The Infatuation acquired Zagat's brand and assets from Google. They did not disclose the amount. They will reportedly operate as two distinct brands, with The Infatuation retaining its editorial-first focus and Zagat will expand user surveys and develop a new tech-driven platform.

#EEEEEATS 
In 2012, The Infatuation started to use #EEEEEATS as a way to tag their food photos on Instagram. The 5 E's are explained as a way to make "[what we do] feel fun" and "[to not] take things too seriously." The hashtag was quickly adopted by the food community and now has grown to over 10 million tags. The company also operates 22 different Instagram handles including the main @infatuation account, one for each of their operating cities, and food-specific accounts like @pizza, @avocadotoast, and @burger.

Underfinger 
In May 2014, The Infatuation published a satirical review of a faux restaurant by the name of Underfinger, featuring "farm to finger" foods like seahorse sashimi and charcuterie gloves. The fictional restaurant was later brought to life in a pop-up event hosted by Brooklyn restaurant Do or Dine. A short-form documentary was created from the pop-up and later earned the company a James Beard Foundation Journalism Award nomination in the Humor category.

EEEEEATSCON 
EEEEEATSCON is The Infatuation's annual food and music festival held at the Barker Hangar in Santa Monica, CA and Forest Hills Stadium in Forest Hills, NY. The event is described as a "Music Festival Catered Towards Food" and included restaurant vendors, musical acts, and speaking engagements.

See also 
 Zagat

References 

Restaurant guides